Woman of Straw is a 1964 crime thriller directed by Basil Dearden and starring Gina Lollobrigida and Sean Connery. It was written by Robert Muller and Stanley Mann, adapted from the 1954 novel La Femme de paille by Catherine Arley.

Plot 
Playboy Tony Richmond schemes to acquire the fortune of his uncle Charles Richmond, a tyrannical, wheelchair-using tycoon, by persuading Maria, the new personal nurse he has hired, to marry the old man. After his uncle's demise Maria becomes a murder suspect. Lollobrigida's character is the Woman of Straw of the title.

Cast 
 Gina Lollobrigida as Maria Marcello
 Sean Connery as Anthony 'Tony' Richmond
 Ralph Richardson as Charles Richmond
 Alexander Knox as Detective Inspector Lomer
 Johnny Sekka as Thomas
 Laurence Hardy as Baynes, the butler
 Peter Madden as Yacht Captain
 Danny Daniels as Fenton
 Michael Goodliffe as Solicitor
 Noel Howlett as Assistant Solicitor

Production
The film was shot at Pinewood Studios, Audley End House in Saffron Walden, Essex and in Majorca in the Balearic Islands between August and October 1963. The Majorca footage, including much footage in a boat off the coast, was shot on location in September 1963. Gina Lollobrigida was reportedly "demanding and temperamental" during the filming, frequently clashing with Connery and Dearden.

Critical reception
In a contemporary review in The New York Times, Eugene Archer wrote, "what could be more archaic than the sight of James Bond himself, Sean Connery, stalking glumly through the very type of old-fashioned thriller he usually mocks? That is exactly what we have in "Woman of Straw," and you can be certain that Mr. Connery did not look one bit more unhappy than yesterday's audience at the Criterion, where the hapless British film crept into town. For, despite the fancy trappings laid on by the respected old producer-director team of Michael Relph and Basil Dearden, this handsomely colored exercise is the kind of pseudo-Victorian nonsense that Alfred Hitchcock long ago laid to rest". In a 2008 review, Steve Lewis in Mystery File noted, "Most of professional reviews have been negative (Variety and so on), but with one tiny qualification on my part, in my opinion most of the professional reviews are wrong. If you are a fan of detective fiction and if you ever come across a copy of this movie, by all means, don't hesitate. Snap it up at once."

References

External links 
 
 

1964 films
1960s crime thriller films
British crime thriller films
Films based on French novels
Films directed by Basil Dearden
Films set in country houses
Films set in England
Films set in London
Films set in Spain
Films shot in Essex
Films shot in Mallorca
Films shot at Pinewood Studios
Seafaring films
United Artists films
Films with screenplays by Stanley Mann
1960s English-language films
1960s British films